Rael Levitt (born 10 May 1971) is an entrepreneur, author and business leader from South Africa. He is a double master's degree graduate from the UCLA Anderson School of Management and the National University of Singapore.

Career 
Levitt founded multiple real estate, investment and asset management companies. He is best known for developing both auctions and logistics parks in Southern Africa.

Early career 
While studying at the University of Cape Town, Levitt sold his first property in 1989. In August 1992, he conducted his first auction on behalf of Absa Bank Ltd and at the age of 21 founded his first auction company, Levco Auctions. Three years later Levitt sold Levco Auctions to Seeff Holdings Ltd and merged the two companies. Levitt was appointed CEO of the merged company that was renamed Seeff Auctions.

Auction Alliance 
After the delisting of Seeff Holdings Ltd in 1998, Levitt completed a management buyout of Seeff Auctions, renamed the company Auction Alliance and became its CEO. In 2006 Auction Alliance sold a 25.1% stake to Amabubesi Investments and in 2010 a 31% stake to Transaction Capital. By 2010 Auction Alliance's turnover was over R300 million, with sales of over R6 billion. In 2011, after a well-publicized dispute arose at an auction, Levitt voluntarily closed Auction Alliance.

Superpom 
In 2012, Levitt acquired a bankrupt Pomegranate orchard at the Bonathaba Farms in Wellington, Cape Town and renamed it Superpom SA. The company became South Africa's largest pomegranate exporter and Levitt became a non-executive Chairman of the company.

Inospace 
In 2017 Levitt founded Inospace, an owner and manager of serviced industrial and logistics parks. The company began with one industrial park in Epping, Cape Town and grew through acquisitions. Under Levitt's leadership, Inospace grew its assets in South Africa and the United Kingdom to over R3billion. In 2022 Inospace concluded a R1,25billion transaction with Fortress REIT Ltd.

Lift Airline 
Levitt is a founding shareholder of Lift Airline, which launched on 10 December 2020. Lift operates on major domestic routes from O. R. Tambo International Airport, Johannesburg using a fleet of Airbus A320 narrow body aircraft, operated by Global Aviation. Levitt is a non-executive director of the airline.

Book 
It Takes a Tsunami (2022), published by Mercury.

Community positions 
In 2010 Levitt was appointed as the Chairman of YAD. He was appointed a trustee of the Rambam Trust, a board member of Glendale care services and the United Jewish Campaign. Levitt is the founding trustee of the Red Circle Trust, which focuses on entrepreneurial educational development.

References

External links
 https://www.raellevitt.com/ 
 https://www.linkedin.com/in/raellevitt/

1971 births
Living people
South African auctioneers